The governor of Tamil Nadu is the head of state of the Indian state of Tamil Nadu. The governors have similar powers and functions at the state level as those of the president of India at central level. They exist in the state appointed by the president of India for a term of five years and they are not local to the state that they are appointed to govern. The factors based on which the president evaluates the candidates is not mentioned in the constitution. The governor acts as the nominal head whereas the real power lies with the chief minister of the state and their council of ministers.

The current incumbent is R. N. Ravi since 18 September 2021.

Powers and functions

The governor enjoys many different types of powers:

Executive powers related to administration, appointments and removals,
Legislative powers related to lawmaking and the state legislature, that is Vidhan Sabha or Vidhan Parishad, and
Discretionary powers to be carried out according to the discretion of the Governor.

Governors

Madras Presidency and Madras State
Headquartered in Fort St. George, Madras Presidency was a province of British India. It comprised present-day Tamil Nadu, the Malabar region of North Kerala, the coastal and Rayalaseema regions of Andhra Pradesh, and the Bellary, Dakshina Kannada, and Udupi districts of Karnataka. It was established in 1653 to be the headquarters of the English settlements on the Coromandel Coast. After India's independence in 1947, Madras State, the precursor to the present day state of Tamil Nadu, was carved out of Madras Presidency. It comprised present-day Tamil Nadu and parts of present-day Karnataka and Kerala.

Tabular

Graphical

Tamil Nadu

Madras State was renamed as Tamil Nadu (Tamil for Tamil country) on 14 January 1969. Governors have similar powers and functions at the state level as that of the President of India at the Central government level. The Governor acts as the nominal head of the state while the Chief Ministers of the states and the Chief Minister's Council of Ministers are invested with most executive powers.

Graphical

Records
 Surjit Singh Barnala is the only appointed Governor to have served two terms in office (24 May 1990–15 February 1991 and 3 November 2004–31 August 2011).
 The longest term in office was that of Surjit Singh Barnala who served as the Governor for a period of almost six and a half years (3 November 2004–31 August 2011).
 The shortest term in office was that of M. M. Ismail who served as the acting Governor for a period of nine days (27 October 1980–4 November 1980).
 The longest term in office as additional in-charge was that of C. Vidyasagar Rao for a period of 1 year 1 month and 4 days (2 September 2016– 6 October 2017).

See also
 Governors of India

 History of Tamil Nadu
 List of Chief Ministers of Tamil Nadu
 List of colonial governors and presidents of Madras Presidency

Notes

References

External links
 Official website of the Governor of Tamil Nadu

 
Tamil Nadu
Governors